The TSV Gersthofen is a German association football club from the town of Gersthofen, Bavaria.

The club's most outstanding achievements were six seasons spend in the third-division Amateurliga Bayern South in the late 1950s and early 1960s and qualifying for the first round of the German Cup in 1980. Experiencing a revival in recent years, TSV achieved promotion back to Bavaria's highest league in 2011 for the first time in almost 50 years.

History
While the club itself dates back to 1909, the football department was only formed in 1926, initially as an independent club, the Eintracht Gersthofen. In 1934, this club then joined TSV Gersthofen.

Eintracht, and later TSV, played in the local amateur leagues of Swabia, never quite breaking through to state level until the late 1950s. Then, in 1957, TSV earned promotion from the 2nd Amateurliga Schwaben to the southern division of the tier-three Amateurliga Bayern. Gersthofen played at this level for six seasons, with a sixth place in 1961 as its best result.

In 1963, the club finished 17th and was relegated. The reorganisation of the German league system because of the introduction of the Fußball-Bundesliga meant that the Amateurliga Bayern was reduced from two to one division and three Landesligas established below, with TSV becoming a founding member of the tier-four Landesliga Bayern-Süd. The club lasted for only one season at this level and was relegated, not to return to this level for another 44 years.

TSV, who had a number of good runs in the Schwaben Cup in the early 1950s, with two cup wins, finished runners up in the competition in 1980, its one outstanding result in this era. Qualified for the German Cup for 1980–81, it made a first round exit when it lost 0–1 to OSC Bremerhaven.

The side became a lower amateur league regular, being a Bezirksliga Schwaben-Nord permanent from 1964 to 1982. In the 1980s, the club briefly dipped down as far as the tier-seven B-Klasse for a season but generally fluctuated between the A-Klasse and the Bezirksliga. A brief change in fortunes came in 2001, when promotion to the Bezirksoberliga Schwaben was earned but the league could not be held. In 2003–04, the club began its return to the more successful days, returning to the Bezirksoberliga for a second time, this time as a top-of-the-table side. TSV finished runners-up twice in three years at this level and managed to earn promotion back to the Landesliga the second time around.

In 2005, the club opened its new stadium, the TSV-Arena.

The first three seasons in the Landesliga became a struggle against relegation but in the fourth season, 2010–11, the team managed to finish second and, through a victory over northern division runners-up SpVgg Selbitz earned promotion back to the Bayernliga, where it was placed in 2011–12. The club experienced some financial trouble during that season and consequently the club declined to apply for a licence for the new Regionalliga Bayern but retained its place in the Bayernliga, entering the southern division of the newly divided league from 2012. At the end of the 2012–13 season TSV was relegated back to the Landesliga, finishing 17th in the southern division of the Bayernliga. After a fourteenth place in the Landesliga in 2014 the club came last in the league the season after and was relegated to the Bezirksliga.

Honours
The club's honours:

League
 Landesliga Bayern-Süd
 Runners-up: 2011
 Bezirksoberliga Schwaben Runners-up: (2) 2005, 2006
 Bezirksliga Schwaben-Nord Champions: 2001, 2004
 Runners-up: 2018

Cup
 Bavarian Cup Winners: 1952
 Runners-up: 1954
 Schwaben Cup' Winners: (2) 1953, 1954
 Runners-up: (5) 1951, 1952, 1964, 1980

Recent seasons
The recent season-by-season performance of the club:Fussball.de – Ergebnisse  Tables and results of all German football leagues

With the introduction of the Bezirksoberligas in 1988 as the new fifth tier, below the Landesligas, all leagues below dropped one tier. With the introduction of the Regionalligas in 1994 and the 3. Liga in 2008 as the new third tier, below the 2. Bundesliga, all leagues below dropped one tier. With the establishment of the Regionalliga Bayern as the new fourth tier in Bavaria in 2012 the Bayernliga was split into a northern and a southern division, the number of Landesligas expanded from three to five and the Bezirksoberligas abolished. All leagues from the Bezirksligas onwards were elevated one tier.

DFB Cup appearances
The club has qualified for the first round of the German Cup just once, in 1980:

References

Sources
 Grüne, Hardy (2001).  Vereinslexikon. Kassel: AGON Sportverlag 
 Die Bayernliga 1945–97''  DSFS, published: 1998

External links
 Official club website  
 Official website of the football department  
 Das deutsche Fußball-Archiv  historical German domestic league tables
 Manfreds Fussball Archiv  Tables and results from the Bavarian amateur leagues
 TSV Gersthofen at Weltfussball.de 

Football clubs in Germany
Football clubs in Bavaria
Association football clubs established in 1926
Football in Swabia (Bavaria)
Sports clubs established in 1909
1909 establishments in Germany